Goodsports is an Australian children's television series, produced by WIN Television in Hobart, Tasmania. The half-hour show premiered in 1991, and was broadcast on WIN Television each Saturday morning at 7.30am, and 9:30am nationally on the Nine Network.  Despite being axed in 2000, WIN Television continued to air repeats of Goodsports at 3:30pm weekdays until 2007.



See also
 WIN Television
 WIN Corporation

References

External links 
 Official Website

WIN Television original programming
Australian children's television series
Television shows set in Tasmania
1991 Australian television series debuts
2000 Australian television series endings